Maximilian "Max" Wissel (born 24 November 1989) is a German racing driver.

Since 2008 he has raced in the Superleague Formula and has raced for FC Basel 1893 in the 2008 season and 2009 season.

Career summary

Superleague Formula

2008-2009

(Races in bold indicate pole position) (Races in italics indicate fastest lap)

2009 Super Final Results

Super Final results in 2009 did not count for points towards the main championship.

2010

  † Non-championship event.

References

External links 
 Official website
 Driver Database information

1989 births
Living people
People from Alzenau
Sportspeople from Lower Franconia
German racing drivers
Superleague Formula drivers
Formula Renault 2.0 NEC drivers
Formula BMW ADAC drivers
Racing drivers from Bavaria
De Villota Motorsport drivers